Deepali Pansare is an Indian actress who primarily works in Hindi television and Hindi films. She made her acting debut in 2008 and is widely known for portraying Suhaagi in Neer Bhare Tere Naina Devi, Payal Singh Raizada in Iss Pyaar Ko Kya Naam Doon?, Devyani Kelkar in Devyani and Sanjana Deshmukh in Aai Kuthe Kay Karte.

Pansare made her film debut with Hello! Gandhe Sir and worked in Fraud Saiyaan. Her other notable work include Chikoo Ki Mummy Durr Kei and Muskuraane Ki Vajah Tum Ho.

Personal life
Pansare married Suveer Safaya, a Kashmiri Pandit and banker on 10 February 2014. The couple have a son named Ruhaan, who was born in 2017.

Career
Pansare made her acting debut in 2008 with Hum Ladkiyan. She went onto portray supporting roles in shows such as Shakuntala, Dill Mill Gayye, Dhoondh Legi Manzil Humein, Devon Ke Dev...Mahadev, Dil Toh Happy Hai Ji and Ghum Hai Kisikey Pyaar Meiin.

She portrayed prominent character of Nooran in Lajwanti and Agent Gauri in Agent Raghav – Crime Branch. She also portrayed episodic roles in Adaalat, SuperCops vs Supervillains and Khidki.

Pansare is best known for her portrayal of Suhaagi in Neer Bhare Tere Naina Devi, Payal Singh Raizada in Iss Pyaar Ko Kya Naam Doon?, Devyani Kelkar in Devyani(her first lead role), Sanjana Deshmukh in Aai Kuthe Kay Karte and Kamini Joshi in Chikoo Ki Mummy Durr Kei.

Pansare made her film debut with Marathi film Hello! Gandhe Sir (2010) and her Hindi film debut with Ek Thi Daayan (2013). She has been part of films including Sunoyona: The Beautiful Eyes (2015), Chalk n Duster (2016) and Fraud Saiyaan (2019).

Pansare portrayed Manju Shekhawat in Muskuraane Ki Vajah Tum Ho which went off air in 2022. She made her web debut with The Broken News in 2022.

Filmography

Films
All films are in Hindi unless otherwise noted.

Television

Web series

References

External links

Actresses in Hindi television
Living people
Actresses in Hindi cinema
21st-century Indian actresses
1984 births